The World Figure Skating Championships is an annual figure skating competition sanctioned by the International Skating Union in which figure skaters compete for the title of World Champion.

Men's competitions took place from February 5 to 6 in Stockholm, Sweden. Ladies' competitions took place from February 4 to 6 in Stockholm, Sweden. Pairs' competition took place on January 29 in Davos, Switzerland.

Results

Men

Judges:
 August Anderberg 
 Josef Fellner 
 Victor Lindqvist 
 Knut Aarn Meinich 
 Otto Petterson

Ladies

Judges:
 August Anderberg 
 Victor Lindqvist 
 Knut Aarn Meinich 
 H. Petterson 
 O. Sampe

Pairs

Judges:
 Ludwig Fänner 
 Josef Feller 
 W. Holsboer 
 Sakari Ilmanen 
 G. Künzli

Sources
 Result List provided by the ISU

World Figure Skating Championships
World Figure Skating Championships
International figure skating competitions hosted by Sweden
International figure skating competitions hosted by Switzerland
Sport in Davos
1922 in Swedish sport
1922 in Swiss sport
1920s in Stockholm
January 1922 sports events
February 1922 sports events
International sports competitions in Stockholm